Rejoicing with the Light is an album by Muhal Richard Abrams released on the Italian Black Saint label in 1983 and featuring performances of five of Abrams' compositions by a fourteen-member orchestra.

Reception
The Allmusic review by Ron Wynn states "He led the orchestra through pieces that were sometimes introspective and other times jubilant and swinging, but never simple or predictable. This session was a challenging, instructive, and entertaining lesson in modern big band writing, arranging and performing". The Penguin Guide to Jazz awarded the album 3 stars stating "These albums seem even more compelling now than they did when they first came out, because it is clear where the leader's ideas are going".

Track listing
All compositions by Muhal Richard Abrams
 "The Heart Is Love and "I Am"" - 10:25  
 "Blessed Be the Heavens at 12" - 9:33  
 "Bloodline" - 7:54  
 "Rejoicing with the Light" - 8:42  
 "Spiral to Clarity" - 4:38

Personnel
Muhal Richard Abrams: piano, conductor
Janette Moody: soprano voice
Warren Smith: percussion, timbales, vibraphone
John Purcell: clarinet, bass clarinet, piccolo, alto saxophone, oboe, flute
Jean-Paul Bourelly: guitar
Vincent Chancey: french Horn
Eugene Ghee: clarinet, bass clarinet, tenor saxophone
Patience Higgins: clarinet, alto clarinet, baritone saxophone
Marty Ehrlich: clarinet, alto saxophone, bass clarinet, flute
Craig Harris: trombone
Baikida Carroll: trumpet, flugelhorn
Howard Johnson: tuba, baritone saxophone, contrabass clarinet
Abdul Wadud: cello
Rick Rozie: bass
Andrew Cyrille: drums

References

1983 albums
Muhal Richard Abrams albums
Black Saint/Soul Note albums